The 1986 Buick WCT Finals was a men's tennis tournament played on indoor carpet courts. It was the 16th edition of the WCT Finals, and was part of the 1986 Nabisco Grand Prix. It was played at the Reunion Arena in Dallas, Texas in the United States from April 7 through April 14, 1986. Unseeded Anders Järryd won the singles title.

Final

Singles

 Anders Järryd defeated  Boris Becker 6–7(3–7), 6–1, 6–1, 6–4
 It was Järryd's first title of the year and the sixth of his career.

References

 

 
Buick WCT Finals
WCT Finals